Ereynetidae is a family of prostig mites in the order Trombidiformes. There are at least two genera and two described species in Ereynetidae.

Genera
 Ereynetes
 Riccardoella

References

Further reading

 
 
 
 

Trombidiformes
Acari families